Richard Hardy may refer to:

 Richard Hardy (MP) (died 1607), English politician, MP for Newport (Isle of Wight)
 Richard Hardy (footballer) (born 1913), English footballer
 Richard Hardy, mayor of Chattanooga, Tennessee, 1923–27
 Richard Hardy (architect) (1850–1904), British architect based in Nottingham